TDIQ (also known as 6,7-methylenedioxy-1,2,3,4-tetrahydroisoquinoline or MDTHIQ) is a drug used in scientific research, which has anxiolytic and anorectic effects in animals. It has an unusual effects profile in animals, with the effects generalising to cocaine and partially to MDMA and ephedrine, but the effects did not generalise to amphetamine and TDIQ does not have any stimulant effects. It is thought these effects are mediated via a partial agonist action at Alpha-2 adrenergic receptors, and TDIQ has been suggested as a possible drug for the treatment of cocaine dependence.

See also
 MDAI
 MDAT
 Norsalsolinol
 Tetrahydroisoquinoline
 C10H11NO2

References

Alpha-2 adrenergic receptor agonists
Heterocyclic compounds with 3 rings
Nitrogen heterocycles
Oxygen heterocycles